Henry Jarvis Savory (4 March 1914 – 4 January 2008) was an English cricketer who played internationally for Nigeria. A right-handed batsman and right-arm medium pace bowler, he played one first-class match for Gloucestershire County Cricket Club in 1937, against New Zealand.

Following his only first-class appearance, he played three matches for Gloucestershire Second XI in 1939. After World War II, he played two matches for Nigeria against Gold Coast in Lagos in 1947 and 1949.

References

1914 births
2008 deaths
English cricketers
Nigerian cricketers
Gloucestershire cricketers